Protein quality is the digestibility and quantity of essential amino acids for providing the proteins in correct ratios for human consumption. There are various methods that rank the quality of different types of protein, some of which are outdated and no longer in use, or not considered as useful as they once were thought to be. The Protein Digestibility Corrected Amino Acid Score (PDCAAS), which was recommended by the Food and Agriculture Organization of the United Nations (FAO), became the industry standard in 1993. FAO has recently recommended the newer Digestible Indispensable Amino Acid Score (DIAAS) to supersede PDCAAS. The dairy industry is in favor of this, because while PDCAAS truncates all protein types that exceed the essential amino acid (EAA) requirements to 1.0, DIAAS allows a higher than 1.0 ranking: while for example both soy protein isolate and whey isolate are ranked 1.0 according to PDCAAS, in the DIAAS system, whey has a higher score than soy.

PDCAAS versus DIAAS
The main limitations of PDCAAS is that it does not take into account anti-nutrient factors like phytic acid and trypsin inhibitors, which limit the absorption of protein among other nutrients, and its use of fecal digestibility, whereas in the DIAAS system, ileal digestibility of the essential amino acids is emphasized as a more accurate measure of protein absorption. For this reason, DIAAS is promoted as the superior method and preferable over the PDCAAS. Due to not factoring in anti-nutritional content into the digestibility equation, the PDCAAS has consequently been criticized for overestimating protein quality. Other older methods like BV, PER, NPU and nitrogen balance may not reveal much about the amino acid profile and digestibility of the protein source in question, but can still be considered useful in that they determine other aspects of protein quality not taken into account by PDCAAS and DIAAS.

Due to the difficulties of measuring amino acid digestion through the ileum, a minimally invasive dual-tracer method has been developed for the DIAAS method.

Protein sources

Amino acid profile

The amino acid score is based on the prevalence of the essential amino acids and depends on if they reach sufficient quantity. PDCAAS scores do not take into account the quantity of the non-essential amino acids. Despite the insufficient essential amino acid profiles of most plant-based proteins, it is possible to combine low lysine with low methionine plant-based proteins, which would yield a more complete protein.

Below follows a table that compares the complete amino acid profiles of various proteins.

*Semi-essential, under certain conditions

**Branched-chain amino acid (BCAA)

Different essential amino acid requirements based on age
While the amino acid scores for PDCAAS and DIAAS are based on toddler requirements (1–3 year olds), the essential amino acid requirements differ for adults and infants. The most demanding essential amino acid requirements are for infants, and as children get older and transition into adulthood, the less proportions of essential amino acids they will need. This also means that many of the vegan protein sources that are limited in one or more essential amino acids, are actually less deficient in essential amino acids for adults, perhaps not deficient at all. The essential amino acid requirements for infants is based on the essential amino acid proportions in human breast milk.

References

Proteins as nutrients
Nutrition